Norman Michael Clifford Maxwell (born 5 March 1976 in Rawene, New Zealand) is a former New Zealand rugby union player.

His usual position was at lock. He initially played for the Hora Hora club and Northland.

On moving to Christchurch his club was Linwood and he played for Canterbury in the NPC and he also represented Crusaders in the Super 12 rugby competition.

Maxwell was educated at Raumanga primary school and Whangarei Boys High School and came to prominence playing for the NZ secondary schools in 1994, after which he represented NZ in the under 19 team in 1995 and the New Zealand colts in 1996 and 1997.

He represented the New Zealand Măori team in 1997-98 and won the award for the most outstanding Măori player in 1999.

He made his All Black debut on 18 June 1999 when he played against Samoa.

In 2000 he played for the UK Barbarians in their 31-41 loss at the Millennium Stadium in Cardiff against South Africa and in 2003 as a substitute for the New Zealand Barbarians in their 17-42 loss against England at Twickenham, London.

In total, Maxwell played 36 test for the All Blacks and scored five (5) tries in the process.

He played his last test for the All Blacks against France on 27 November 2004.

He played the last of his 75 games for the Crusaders in 2005.

All Blacks Statistics
Tests: 36 (0 as Captain)
Games: 0 (0 as Captain)
Total Matches: 36 (0 as Captain)
Test Points: 25pts (5t, 0c, 0p, 0dg, 0m)
Game Points: 0pts
Total Points: 25pts (5t, 0c, 0p, 0dg, 0m)

References

External links

1976 births
Living people
Rugby union locks
New Zealand rugby union players
New Zealand international rugby union players
Canterbury rugby union players
Crusaders (rugby union) players
People from the Hokianga
Barbarian F.C. players
Māori All Blacks players
People educated at Whangarei Boys' High School
Rugby union players from the Northland Region